Japan Sinks is a 1973 science fiction novel by Sakyo Komatsu.

Japan Sinks may also refer to:

Tidal Wave (1973 film) (Nihon Chinbotsu, lit. "Japan Sinks"), an adaptation directed by Shiro Moritani
Japan Sinks: 2020, a 2020 anime series adaptation based on the novel
Japan Sinks: People of Hope, a 2021 TBS adaptation of the 1973 novel

See also
Sinking of Japan, a 2006 remake film based on the 1973 version